William MacLaren was a rugby union international who represented England in the first rugby international in 1871.

Early life
William MacLaren was born on 1844 in Chorlton, Lancashire.

Rugby union career
MacLaren made his international debut on 27 March 1871 at Edinburgh in the first international and was contested by Scotland and England. He was one of four representatives from the Manchester Football Club, at the time Lancashire's foremost club.

References

1844 births
Year of death missing
English rugby union players
England international rugby union players
Rugby union three-quarters
Rugby union players from Chorlton-cum-Hardy
Manchester Rugby Club players